The 2017–18 Ohio State Buckeyes women's basketball team represented the Ohio State University during the 2017–18 NCAA Division I women's basketball season. The Buckeyes, led by 5th year head coach Kevin McGuff, played their home games at Value City Arena and were a member of the Big Ten Conference. They finished the season 28–7, 13–3 in Big Ten play to win the regular season title. They defeated Rutgers, Minnesota, and Maryland to win the Big Ten women's basketball tournament. As a result, they received the conference's automatic bid to the NCAA women's tournament as the No. 3 seed in the Spokane region. There they defeated George Washington in the First Round before being upset by No. 11-seeded Central Michigan in the Second Round.

Previous season 
The Buckeyes finished the 2016–17 season 28–7, 15–1 in Big Ten play to win a share of the Big Ten regular season title with Maryland. They defeated Northwestern in the quarterfinals of the Big Ten women's basketball tournament before losing to Purdue. They received at-large bid of the NCAA women's tournament as the No. 5 seed in the Lexington region. There they defeated Western Kentucky and Kentucky to advance to the Sweet Sixteen. In the Sweet Sixteen, they lost to Notre Dame.

Roster

Schedule and results

|-
! colspan="9" style=| Exhibition

|-
! colspan="9" style=| Regular season

|-

|-

|-

|-

|-

|-

|-

|-

|-

|-

|-

|-

|-

|-

|-

|-

|-

|-

|-

|-
! colspan="9" style=| Big Ten Women's Tournament

|-
! colspan="9" style=| NCAA Women's Tournament

Rankings

See also
 2017–18 Ohio State Buckeyes men's basketball team

References

External links

Ohio State Buckeyes women's basketball seasons
Ohio State
Ohio State
Ohio State Buckeyes
Ohio State Buckeyes